Lauder Business School is an English-language business school in Vienna, Austria, operating as a "University of Applied Sciences" in the Austrian education system. Lauder Business School (LBS) was founded in 2003 as a University of Applied Sciences with financial help from Ronald S. Lauder. There are currently app. 350 students enrolled in one undergraduate and two graduate programs.
 
Lauder Business School is a fully recognized and government-funded University of Applied Sciences. LBS degree programs are in line with the Bologna requirements, accredited by the Agency for Quality Assurance and Accreditation Austria and listed with the Austrian Federal Ministry of Science, Research and Economy.

History and development 

In 2003 the Ronald Lauder Foundation established the Lauder Business School, under its President Ronald S. Lauder. Vienna as a location was chosen as a bridge between western and eastern traditions and to form an international University. The university combines American and European educational methods and is connected to the Harvard MOC (Microeconomics of Competitiveness) Network, which includes more than 100 major business schools from 65 different countries. Building on the key concepts of Professor Michael Porter the network provides scholarship, research and capacity building.
During the first years of its existence, Lauder Business School offered an 8-semester Magister degree in International Marketing and Management, but since 2007 students have been accepted to two new programmes: a 6-semester Bachelor and a 4-semester Master's. At the moment the university offers one Bachelor in International Business Administration, a master's degree in International Management and Leadership and one in Strategic Finance and Business Analytics.

Campus 

Lauder Business School has one campus, which includes a main building with classrooms, library, an administration building, auditoriums, a dining building and a student residence (in cooperation with Jewish Heritage Center). The main part which is located in the north has a size of 1.200 m² that provides enough space for lecture- and seminar rooms. Another 750 m² are used as office space. At the southern end of the park the student residence is located. They are all located in the Döbling district of Vienna, between Pyrkergasse and Hofzeile. These buildings (except one for the auditorium and dining room, which was built especially for the school) comprise a former palace of Maria Theresa, given to her by Charles IV and built by Nicolò Pacassi.
Later the building was owned by members of the Rothschild family and served as a hospital.
The Bank Austria Creditanstalt Auditorium was built in 2003 and is dedicated to Gerhard Randa, former chairman of BA-CA. 
The conversion and extension of the baroque ensemble of Lauder Business School was done by Kuhn Malvezzi, a Berlin-based architecture bureau.

Educational programs 
The university offers the following studies:

 International Business Administration – Bachelor (6 Semesters, 180 ECTS): The studies focus on an international, competitive education with a great part of practical application. The graduates will be prepared to work at international organizations or enterprises. 
 International Management and Leadership – Master (4 Semesters, 120 ECTS): During this academic program students deepen their knowledge in applied business administration and increase their management and leadership skills. The graduates are trained to work in upper management positions in globally oriented companies. The Master centers on learning the foundations of executive management as for example decision-making and learning to strategize within complex structures. Students also receive a SAP beginner´s certificate.
 Strategic Finance and Business Analytics – Master (4 Semesters, 120 ECTS): The program combines contemporary knowledge and concepts in the field of international finance and corporate strategy with the latest trends in business analytics. The curriculum is designed to provide students with an in-depth understanding of the finance sector as well as the appropriate financial management of corporations in the non-financial industry.
The university offers within their own language department classes in German, Hebrew, Chinese, Russian and Spanish. The students are required to choose at least one of those languages to develop intercultural competences.

International collaborations and research 
Lauder Business School is a member of the Harvard MOC Network (Microeconomics of Competitiveness). Within this network it has established an Institute of Competitiveness (IoC), which focuses on urban competitiveness and on diversity challenges in international management. The IoC is the first of its kind in Austria.
The LBS has diverse international partnerships with institutions or companies such as the Ben-Gurion University of the Negev, Bar-Ilan University, Interdisciplinary Center Herzliya, Alexandru Ioan Cuza University of Iași in Romania, the University of Applied Sciences Upper Austria, the RHI AG, the Bank Austria Unicredit Group and the Vienna Insurance Group.

Integration of Judaism 
The university itself is secular and there is no influence of religion on the business studies curriculum. But LBS is adjusted to Jews and people interested in Judaism. There are no classes on the major Jewish holidays, nor on Austrian bank holidays.

See also 
 Education in Austria 
 List of business schools in Europe

External links 
 Official Site of Lauder Business School

Notes and references 

Business schools in Austria
Education in Vienna
Educational institutions established in 2003
Jewish education in Austria
Buildings and structures in Döbling
Universities of Applied Sciences in Austria
2003 establishments in Austria
Private universities and colleges in Austria